Garston is a suburban village in Hertfordshire, England. Garston is contiguous with Watford and now, despite retaining a local identity, is effectively a suburb. It is within the Stanborough, Woodside and Meriden wards of the borough of Watford, although a small number of its streets are in Hertsmere.

The Building Research Establishment has its headquarters within Garston.

Garston has several large secondary schools including St Michael's Catholic High School, Parmiter's School and Future Academies Watford, formerly known as Francis Combe. 

The A41 is the perceived border of Garston and North Watford; it crosses St Albans Road (A412) at the Dome Roundabout.

Transport
Garston railway station on the Abbey line is served by West Midlands Trains services. Arriva London operated a bus garage in Garston. It closed in 2018, and was completely demolished in early 2022

References

Villages in Hertfordshire
Watford